Blairmore is a locality in the North Burnett Region, Queensland, Australia.

Geography 
The Burnett Highway passes from north to south through the north-western part of Blairmore.

References 

North Burnett Region
Localities in Queensland